Wake Up 2 is a 2017 Taiwanese television series and sequel to Wake Up, with the story set 5 years after the prequel, starring the original cast with the addition of Lego Lee and Summer Meng. This is also Lee and Meng's third collaboration after 2013 film 27°C - Loaf Rocks and 2014 television series Aim High. Wake Up 2 is the first Taiwanese television series to film in a Middle Eastern country, where filming took place in refugee camps in the Northern Borders Region of the Jordan River and Syria, to depict the selflessness and heroism of humanitarian rescue. The main storylines involve the humanitarian rescue in Middle East, a subway bombing incident in Kaohsiung (filmed in Taoyuan HSR station), the continuation of Human Meatball Controversy from series one, and the restructuring of National Public Healthcare in 2016. Wake Up 2'''s tag-line is "Never Give Up", which serves not only as a line of encouragement, but also as a question on when they should or have to give up (e.g. abandon operation, stop resuscitation to a deceased patient, etc.)

With a total of thirteen episodes, Wake Up 2's production budget was five times more than the first installment in the series, up to NT$60 million, with majority of the budget spent on hiring cameos, medical consultants and making false cadavers from animal innards. Filming in Taiwan began on August 19, 2016, in Kaohsiung and ended on January 17, 2017, in Taipei. The crew then head for Jordan to film the war scenes as Jordan is relatively safer than Syria. Filming was completed on February 14, 2017, and entered post production for another 6 to 7 months before release.

At the end of each episode, Before Waking Up, Outside the Storm is a mini aftershow which shows behind-the-scenes interviews. Similar to Wake Up'', each week in the premiere is shown in two episodes, with the final episode being a single finale plus a one-hour feature length behind-the-scenes episode, where the entire makings of most props and logics behind the storylines are revealed. The show did not air on week of September 30 for the live broadcast of the 52nd Golden Bell Awards.

Following the release of Wake Up 2, the creative team decided not to move forward with a third season onward, as they thought 2 had a perfect ending that wrapped up the story. Despite there were talks/ideas of a potential continuation during writing stages, producers have noted this would be up to the decision for the studios to make the decision.

Cast

Main

Supporting

Backstage Roles 
Off-screen, some actors also function as part of the production crew behind the scenes. Kerr Hsu doubled as a casting assistant to scout for new actors; Alice Huang doubled as a performance director, while Jag Huang doubled as an assistant stunt director. Lin Chi-ju is also the director of the drama, so he stated in the final behind the scenes that he would never direct the scenes that he would act in as Qiu Da Yi, the homeless suicide bomber.

Soundtrack

Production 
Filming locations in Taiwan include E-Da Hospital, particularly the cancer care unit and Chinese Medicine GP office in Kaohsiung and Grand Mayfull Hotel in Taipei, the refugee camp in the Northern Borders of Jordan. The subway bombing scene was filmed in Airport Hotel Station in Taoyuan which was still under construction at the time.

Reception 
The ending of Wake Up 2 was praised to critical acclaim to critics and audiences alike, though some were slightly divided on the ending.

References

External links
  
 

2017 Taiwanese television series debuts
2017 Taiwanese television series endings
Public Television Service original programming
Formosa Television original programming
Gala Television original programming
Taiwanese medical television series
2